NGC 4060 is a lenticular galaxy located 320 million light-years away in the constellation Coma Berenices. It was discovered by astronomer Albert Marth on March 18, 1865 and is a member of the NGC 4065 Group which is part of the Coma Supercluster.

NGC 4060 is classified as a LINER galaxy.

See also
 List of NGC objects (4001–5000)

References

External links

4060
38151
Coma Berenices
Astronomical objects discovered in 1865
Lenticular galaxies
LINER galaxies
Discoveries by Albert Marth
NGC 4065 Group